Sara Berman Bloom is an American philanthropist, journalist, and director of Jewish organizations.

Berman was born on New York city's Upper East Side, and is the daughter of hedge fund manager Michael Steinhardt.  She is married to Mark Bloom and has six children from her first marriage.

Sara Bloom has been an editor at The Forward and was the parenting columnist for the New York Sun newspaper.  She is a trustee of the Steinhardt Foundation for Jewish Life.

Sara Berman  is a founder and the board chair of Hebrew Public, a national network of US-based Hebrew-English dual-language charter schools. She is also the vice chairwoman of the board of The Steinhardt Foundation for Jewish Life and serves on the boards of the Areivim Philanthropic Group, OneTable: The Shabbat Project, and the National Alliance for Public Charter Schools.

References

21st-century American Jews
Jewish American philanthropists
American philanthropists
Living people
Year of birth missing (living people)